Admiral Sir George Knightley Chetwode, KCB, CBE (10 December 1877 – 11 March 1957) was a Royal Navy officer who became Naval Secretary.

Naval career
Born the son of Sir George Chetwode, 6th Baronet, Chetwode joined the Royal Navy and was appointed a Lieutenant in December 1899. He was appointed temporary to the gunboat HMS Esk, in lieu of a sub-lieutenant, on 31 December 1899. The following year he served on the China Station during the Boxer Rebellion in 1900.

He served in World War I taking part in the Battle of Jutland in 1916 and commanding destroyers for the rest of the War. He was appointed Deputy Director of Naval Intelligence in 1923 and then given command of the battleship  followed by the battleship HMS Warspite. He was made Naval Secretary in 1929 and Commander of the 1st Cruiser Squadron in the Mediterranean Fleet in 1932. His last appointment was as Admiral commanding the reserves in 1933 before he retired in 1936.

Family
In 1908 he married Alice Clara Vaughan-Lee; they had two sons. In 1939 he married Elizabeth Jane Taylor.

References

1877 births
1957 deaths
Royal Navy admirals
Knights Commander of the Order of the Bath
Commanders of the Order of the British Empire